The First Division League (FDL for short), also called the Yelo league for sponsorship reasons, is the second tier of professional football in Saudi Arabia. The First Division League is ranked below the Saudi Professional League and above the Saudi Second Division in the Saudi Arabian football league system. All of the FDL clubs qualify for the King Cup, the annual Saudi Cup competition. Al Khaleej are the most recent champions, winning their second title during the 2021-22 season.

The number of clubs in the league has changed throughout history, most recently in the 2018–19 season, when the number of clubs increased from 16 to 20. Since the 2019–20 season, three clubs from the First Division are directly promoted to the Pro League; on the other hand, four clubs are directly relegated to the Second Division.

Hajer and Al-Wehda hold the record number of championships in the league with four. While Ohod holds the record for number of promotions from the First Division to the Pro League, nine.

Promotion and relegation
The top three teams are promoted to the Professional League directly, while the bottom three teams are relegated to the Second Division.

List of teams (2020–21 season)
For details on the MS League 2020–21 season, see here.

Note: Table lists in alphabetical order.

League rules
Since the 2018–19 season the number of foreign players in the league was increased from 3 to 7. Seven substitutes are permitted to be selected, from which three can be used in the duration of the game.

Club performances

Promotions by season

Note 1First Division and Premier League were merged in 1981–82.

Performance by club

Top scorers

See also
 Saudi Arabia Football Federation

References

External links

 Saudi Arabia Football Federation
 Saudi Arabia First Division - Hailoosport.com (Arabic)
 Saudi Arabia First Division - Hailoosport.com

 
2
Second level football leagues in Asia
Sports leagues established in 1976